De Clercq or de Clercq is a surname of Dutch origin. People with the name include:

 Andrew DeClercq (born 1973), American basketball player
 Bart De Clercq (born 1986), Belgian professional bicycle road racer
 Daniël de Clercq (1854–1931), Dutch socialist and vegetarian activist
 Erik De Clercq (born 1941), Belgian physician and biologist
 Hans De Clercq (born 1969), former Belgian racing cyclist
 Jean De Clercq (1905–1984), Belgian footballer
 Jean-Christophe De Clercq (born 1966), French artist
 Lucas de Clercq (1603–1652), Dutch cloth merchant, subject of painter Frans Hals
 Mario De Clercq (born 1966), Belgian professional bicycle racer
 Mathias De Clercq (born 1981), Belgian politician
 Peter de Clercq (born 1959), Dutch diplomat
 Peter De Clercq (born 1966), Belgian professional bicycle road racer
 René de Clercq (1877–1932), Flemish-Dutch political activist, writer, poet, and composer
 Staf De Clercq (1884–1942), Flemish Nazi collaborator and Flemish nationalist
 Willem de Clercq (1795–1844), Dutch poet and leader of the Protestant Revival in the Netherlands
 Willy De Clercq (1927–2011), Belgian politician and government minister

See also 
 
 Declercq, surname of the same origin
 2852 Declercq, minor planet
 Klerk
 Leclercq (surname)
 Leclerc (surname)
 Clerc (surname)
 De Clerc (surname)

References 

Surnames of Belgian origin
Dutch-language surnames
Occupational surnames